Queen Kapiolani Regional Park is the largest and second-oldest public park in Hawaii, located in Honolulu on the east end of Waikiki just beyond Kuhio Beach Park and the Waikiki residential neighborhood. The  park, named after Queen Kapiolani, the queen consort of King David Kalākaua, is home to the Waikiki Shell and the Honolulu Zoo.

History

Kingdom of Hawaii 

In the 1870s, King Kalākaua was asked to find a permanent, dry course for horse racing. Since Waikiki was popular with wealthy racing fans, Kalākaua chose the unoccupied and dry plain at the foot of Diamond Head where the park now stands. On June 11, 1877,  the park was dedicated as the first Hawaiian public space. Scotsman Archibald Scott Cleghorn was vice president and later president of the Kapiolani Park Association, a group of businessmen who convinced Kalākaua to give them a 30-year lease for $1 per year. A share in the association cost $50, and allowed shareholders to lease property on Waikiki Beach. By the 1880s, many of Hawaii's wealthiest citizens had leased property through the association until the overthrow of the Kingdom of Hawaii, during which most of the properties were returned to the city or condemned. A lease was granted to the Honolulu Cricket Club in 1893. Top cricket players from San Francisco's California Cricket Association played for local teams.

Republic of Hawaii 
After the overthrow, the land was conveyed to the Republic of Hawaii and managed by the Honolulu Park Commission. The legislation provided that the park be set aside permanently as a free public park and recreation ground, forbade the sale or lease of land in the park, and prohibited charging of any entrance fees. Since 1913, the park has been maintained by the City and County of Honolulu's Department of Parks & Recreation.

In the 1920s, plans to drain the Ala Wai Canal through Kapiolani Park filled the park with mud and rubbish. It was rarely used until 1952, when it was renovated and its current boundaries were established.

Today 

Besides the Honolulu Zoo and the Waikiki Shell, the park includes tennis and basketball courts, soccer, baseball, lacrosse and rugby fields and an archery range. The park hosts many international lacrosse and rugby tournaments a year. Its bandstand serves as an entertainment venue. It is also a popular course for joggers who utilize its two-mile (3 km) circumference. The park also serves as both the starting and finish lines of road races in Honolulu, including the Honolulu Marathon.

Kapiolani park is also home to Honolulu Cricket Club, the only cricket club in the Hawaiian Islands. Founded in 1893, it is the oldest sporting club in the Pacific according to Guinness World Records.

As Kapiolani Park continues south, it becomes Kapiolani Beach Park, adjacent to Kuhio Beach and Waikiki Beach. The park itself also serves as a natural border between Waikiki and Diamond Head neighborhood.

References

Parks in Hawaii
Geography of Honolulu
Rugby league stadiums in the United States
Protected areas of Oahu
Tourist attractions in Honolulu
Waikiki
Protected areas established in 1877
1877 establishments in Hawaii
Cricket in Hawaii